Rafael Pérez Pareja (1836–1897) was a public figure in 19th-century Ecuador, a supporter of liberalism.

He served as Vice President of Ecuador from 15 October 1883 to 10 February 1884.

Born in the household formed by José María Pérez Calisto, Knight First Class of the Royal American Order of Isabel the Catholic, and Leonor de Pareja y Arteta.

He fought vehemently against the dictatorship of Ignacio de Veintemilla.

He was military chief of the province of Pichincha, only to be interim president of Ecuador as a member of pentavirato who ruled the country between 14 January and 15 October 1883, along with Pablo Herrera, Luis Cordero, Pedro Lizarzaburu and Agustin Guerrero.

He married Munoz Antonia Chiriboga in 1850.

References

Sources
Diego Pérez-Ordóñez, Genealogía de los Pérez de Quito, descendientes de don Pedro Pérez Muñoz, publicaciones Ceniga, Quito, 1994.
Fernando Jurado Noboa, Los Chiriboga, Quito, 1989.

External links
 GENEALOGÍA, orígenes familiares y descendencia de Rafael Pérez Pareja, en la base de datos genealógica para Ecuador de Mauricio Alvarado-Dávila.
 Página oficial del Gobierno Ecuatoriano sobre la historia de los presidentes

1836 births
1897 deaths
Presidents of Ecuador
Vice presidents of Ecuador
Ecuadorian Radical Liberal Party politicians
People from Quito